Grahams Creek is a rural locality in the Fraser Coast Region, Queensland, Australia.

History 
The locality takes its name from its former railway station, which in turn was derived from the creek name. The creek in turn takes its name from pastoralist Hugh Graham who established the Marianna pastoral run in 1848.

In May 2012, a  saltwater crocodile was found in the Mary River between Brothers Island and the mainland near the locality of Beaver Rock, significantly further south than the normal range for such a crocodile. As per Queensland Government policy, crocodiles spotted south of the Boyne River are trapped and relocated to their natural habitat by wildlife official. However, the crocodile eluded the trap for many months, with wildlife officials reporting confirmed sightings of a second smaller crocodile in the river in July 2013. The smaller female crocodile was trapped in November 2013. In November 2014, the larger male crocodile was harpooned approximately  up the river at Grahams Creek to be relocated to Koorana crocodile farm at Rockhampton.

References 

Fraser Coast Region
Localities in Queensland